The Bangkok Aquarium, founded in 1940, is the oldest aquarium in Thailand. Located in Kasetsart University main campus, Bangkok, the aquarium is home to about 560 species of freshwater fish native to Thailand as well as about 100 species of aquarium plants. The showcase species include Chao Phraya giant catfish, Siamese giant carp, and Siamese tigerfish. The aquarium is owned and operated by the Department of Fisheries of Thailand.

Information
Location: In the campus of Kasetsart University, Phahonyothin Road, Lat Yao Sub-district, Chatuchak District, Bangkok.

Getting there: by bus: (BMTA buses) 26, 34, 39, 59, 107, 114, 129, 185, 503, 522, 543 (Nonthaburi Pier) (affiliated & minibuses) 34, 39, 51, 126, 524; by BTS Skytrain: Kasetsart University BTS station: exit 1

Opening hours:	10.00 – 16.00 hours (closed on Mondays)

Admission fee:	20 baht/ person

References

External links
  (in Thai)

Tourist attractions in Bangkok
Aquaria in Thailand
Buildings and structures in Bangkok
1940 establishments in Thailand